Dorcadion oetalicum is a species of beetle in the family Cerambycidae. It was described by Pic in 1902, originally as a varietas of the species Dorcadion heldreichi. It is known from Greece.

References

oetalicum
Beetles described in 1902